Arthur Frederic Kip (27 September 1910, Los Angeles – 2 December 1995, Berkeley, California) was an American experimental physicist, specializing in solid-state physics. He was a Guggenheim Fellow for the academic year 1958–1959.

Biography 

After secondary education in San Diego, Kip matriculated at the University of California, Berkeley (UC Berkeley), where he graduated with A.B. in 1935 and Ph.D. in 1939. His doctoral advisor was Leonard B. Loeb.

In the UC Berkeley physics department, Kip was a professor from 1951 to 1976, when he retired as professor emeritus. In the summer of 1951, he brought a considerable amount of equipment and used his expertise in electron spin resonance (ESR) to set up a laboratory with the help of Alan M. Portis and Thomas Griswold. The three of them built most of their own equipment. (Thomas Griswold (1925–2006) was a graduate student at UC Berkeley and received his Ph.D. there in 1953.) Kip's laboratory and research group used microwave resonance techniques to investigate solid-state physics. He was the author or co-author of almost 100 papers. He was for the academic year 1958–1959 a Guggenheim Fellow at the University of Cambridge, UK and for the academic year 1962–1963 a Miller Institute Fellow at Berkeley.

He wrote a successful introductory college textbook Fundamentals of Electricity and Magnetism (McGraw-Hill, 1962; 2nd edition, 1968). His doctoral students include Peter Demos, George Feher, Donald N. Langenberg, and Alan M. Portis.

Upon his death, Kip was survived by his widow, a daughter, a son, and two grandchildren.

Selected publications

References

1910 births
1995 deaths
20th-century American physicists
Experimental physicists
University of California, Berkeley alumni
Massachusetts Institute of Technology faculty
University of California, Berkeley College of Letters and Science faculty